The Hermitage of San Isidro (Spanish: Ermita de San Isidro) is a hermitage located in Alcalá de Henares, Spain. It was declared Bien de Interés Cultural in 1995.

References 

Buildings and structures in Alcalá de Henares
Christian hermitages in Spain
Bien de Interés Cultural landmarks in the Community of Madrid